Tréguennec is a commune in the Finistère department of Brittany in north-western France.

Population
Inhabitants of Tréguennec are called in French Tréguennecois.

The Chapelle de Saint-Vio is named after Saint Vouga.

See also
Communes of the Finistère department
List of the works of the Maître de Plougastel

References

External links

Official website 

Mayors of Finistère Association 

Communes of Finistère